Viscount Newark is a title that has been created twice in British history, each time with the subsidiary title of Baron Pierrepont.

The first creation was on 29 June 1627 in the Peerage of England for Sir Robert Pierrepont. This creation was to become the courtesy title for the heir apparent to the Earldom of Kingston-upon-Hull, with this title being bestowed on the first Viscount Newark in 1628. The fifth Earl was created Duke of Kingston-upon-Hull in 1715 in the Peerage of Great Britain, with the Dukedom becoming extinct on the death of the second Duke in 1773.

The second creation was on 23 July 1796 in the Peerage of Great Britain for Charles Pierrepont, with the territorial designation of Newark on Trent. The first Viscount of this creation was the grandson of the first Duke of Kingston-upon-Hull, and was named as the heir of the second Duke in his will. The first Viscount succeeded to the Duke's estates (though not his titles) on the death of the Duke's wife in 1788. He was further created Earl Manvers in the Peerage of the United Kingdom in 1806. These titles became extinct upon the death of the sixth Earl in 1955.

Viscounts Newark, first creation (1627)
 Robert Pierrepont, 1st Viscount Newark (1584–1643) (created Earl of Kingston-upon-Hull in 1628)
 For further succession, see Earl of Kingston-upon-Hull

Viscounts Newark, of Newark on Trent, second creation (1796)
 Charles Pierrepont, 1st Viscount Newark (1737–1816) (created Earl Manvers in 1806)
 For further succession, see Earl Manvers

References

 , . Retrieved on 17 November 2008.

Noble titles created in 1627
Extinct viscountcies in the Peerage of England
Noble titles created in 1796
Extinct viscountcies in the Peerage of Great Britain
1627 establishments in England